Creswell High School (Oregon) is a public high school in Creswell, Oregon, United States.

Academics
In 2008, 80% of the school's seniors received their high school diploma. Of 84 students, 67 graduated, 12 dropped out, 2 received a modified diploma, and 3 remained in high school.

In 2009, 94.9% of the school's seniors received their high school diploma. Of the senior class: 93 graduated, 5 dropped out, and 0 received a modified diploma.

Athletics

State championships
 Boys Basketball: 1969, 2000, 2004
 Boys Track and Field: 1962 OSAA

Notable alumni
Mark Few- Gonzaga Bulldogs men's basketball head coach (class of 1981)
Luke Jackson (basketball, born 1981) - (retired basketball player) (class of 2000)
Chloe Halgren (soccer) (basketball )(softball)- (elite soccer captain) (class of 2024)
Dakota Carson (soccer) (basketball (softball))- (elite soccer captain) (class of 2024)
Tailey Carson (soccer) (basketball) (softball)- (elite soccer captain) (class of 2024)

References

High schools in Lane County, Oregon
Public high schools in Oregon
Creswell, Oregon